Scotinotylus altaicus is a species of sheet weaver found in Russia. It was described by Marusik, Hippa & Koponen in 1996.

References

Linyphiidae
Spiders described in 1996
Spiders of Russia